A gear is a toothed wheel designed to transmit torque to another gear or toothed component.

Gear or gears may also refer to:

Arts, entertainment and media

Fictional characters
 Richie Foley, aka Gear, from Static Shock
 Gears, a character from the G.I. Joe franchise
 Gears, a character from the Transformers franchise

Other uses in arts, entertainment and media
 Gears, a 1975 album by Johnny Hammond
 Gear, a comic book limited series by Image Comics
 Gear, an American men's magazine
 GEAR, a Japanese long-run theatre show 
 Gear (The Village Voice), a 1969 character sketch

Science and technology
 Gears (software), formerly Google Gears, utility software by Google
 Landing gear, the undercarriage of an aircraft
 Samsung Gear, a line of wearable computing devices

Other uses
 Gear (name), including a list of people with the name
 Gender Equality Architecture Reform, an international NGO campaign
 Geared, maritime transport vessels equipped with cranes
 USS Gear (ARS-34), a 1942 U.S. Navy ship

See also

 Gearing (disambiguation)
 Geer (disambiguation)
 Top Gear (disambiguation)
 Geare, a surname
 Computer configuration
 Equipment
 Narcotic